The following highways are numbered 32A:

United States
 New England Interstate Route 32A (former)
 Hawaii Route 32A
 Massachusetts Route 32A
 Nevada State Route 32A (former)
 New York State Route 32A
 County Route 32A (Otsego County, New York)
 County Route 32A (Suffolk County, New York)